Sehrish Nagar (Sindhi:سحرش نگر) is a main town along the bank of the Indus River. It is very close to Qasimabad , towards west of Hyderabad Sindh, Pakistan. This town is included in Qasimabad Taluka of Hyderabad District, Sindh.

References 

Towns in Pakistan